Vallenar Airport (is an airport serving Vallenar, a city in the Atacama Region of Chile.

The airport is on the south side of the city, with hills nearby to the east and south.

See also

Transport in Chile
List of airports in Chile

References

External links
Vallenar Airport at OpenStreetMap
Vallenar Airport at OurAirports

Airports in Chile
Airports in Atacama Region